(born 16 October 1994 in Almaty) is a Kazakhstani beauty pageant titleholder who was crowned Miss Kazakhstan 2013 for Miss Universe 2013. She competed at the pageant in Moscow, Russia.

Miss Kazakhstan 2013
Aygerim was crowned as Miss Universe Kazakhstan 2013 after Zhazira Nurimbetova withdrew to compete at the Miss Universe 2013. Aygerim was appointed to represent Kazakhstan at the Miss Universe 2013, Aygerim won the title of Miss Almaty 2013.

References

External links
 Miss Kazakhstan official website

1994 births
Living people
Kazakhstani beauty pageant winners
Miss Universe 2013 contestants